James Lee Bunn (born December 12, 1956) is an American politician from Oregon. A native of Yamhill County, he served in the Oregon State Senate before election to the United States House of Representatives where he served one term. A Republican, he now works as a correctional officer for the county.

Early life and education 
James Lee Bunn was born in McMinnville and graduated from Dayton High School. He earned a Bachelor of Arts degree from Northwestern Nazarene College in 1979, and remains a member of the Church of the Nazarene.

Career 
Bunn worked in agribusiness, and from 1987 until his election to Congress, served in the Oregon National Guard. A Republican, he was a member of the Oregon State Senate from 1987 to 1995, where he served as Republican whip from 1990 to 1995.

United States House of Representatives 
In 1994, he was elected to the United States House of Representatives, representing . During his one term in the House from 1995 to 1997, Bunn divorced his wife of 17 years, with whom he had five children, and married Sonja Skurdal, an aide in his congressional office whom he made his chief of staff. Bunn then paid Skurdal more than any other congressional aide in Oregon at that time. In the 1996 election, this scandal contributed to his loss to Democrat Darlene Hooley.

Later career 
After leaving Congress, Bunn became a sheriff's deputy at the Yamhill County jail. In 2008, he was a candidate for the Oregon House of Representatives in the state's 24th district which includes McMinnville, but was defeated in the primary by Jim Weidner.

Personal life 
Bunn's family includes other notable public figures, such as his brother Stan Bunn, a former Oregon superintendent of public instruction and member of both houses of the state legislature. Another brother, Tom Bunn, is a former Yamhill County commissioner and was briefly a state senator. All three brothers served in the legislature for a short time in from July 1992 to January 1993.

References

External links 

1956 births
American members of the Church of the Nazarene
American prison officers
Businesspeople from Oregon
Businesspeople in agriculture
Candidates in the 2022 United States House of Representatives elections
Living people
Northwest Nazarene University alumni
Republican Party Oregon state senators
People from Dayton, Oregon
People from McMinnville, Oregon
Republican Party members of the United States House of Representatives from Oregon
United States Army soldiers